Balliet Run (also known as Balliet's Run) is a tributary of Big Wapwallopen Creek in Luzerne County, Pennsylvania, in the United States. The stream itself is fairly small and has two unnamed tributaries. It is considered to be Class A Wild Trout Waters and is inhabited by brook trout and brown trout. Wisconsinan Till, fill, and bedrock consisting of sandstone, conglomerate, and shale occur in the vicinity of the stream.

Course

Balliet Run begins at the base of Nescopeck Mountain, not far from Nescopeck Pass in Dorrance Township. It flows west for a few tenths of a mile, crossing Interstate 81. The stream then turns west-southwest for several tenths of a mile before turning west and slightly south for a few miles along the northern side of Nescopeck Mountain, passing by Springtown along the way. It then turns northwest and away from Nescopeck Mountain for nearly a mile and receives an unnamed tributary from the right before turning west-southwest for approximately a mile and exiting Dorrance Township. Upon exiting Dorrance Township, the stream enters Hollenback Township. It turns south for a few tenths of a mile, approaching Nescopeck Mountain again and receiving an unnamed tributary from the left. The stream then turns west and then west-southwest, briefly entering Butler Township before reentering Hollenback Township. It then turns west-northwest for several tenths of a mile before turning southwest and then meandering west for a short distance to its confluence with Big Wapwallopen Creek.

Tributaries
Balliet Run has no named tributaries. However, it does have two unnamed tributaries.

Hydrology
The peak annual discharge of Balliet Run has a 10 percent chance of reaching 780 cubic feet per second. It has a 2 percent chance of reaching 1300 cubic feet per second and 1 percent chance of reaching 1600 cubic feet per second. The stream's peak annual discharge has a 0.2 percent chance of reaching 2250 cubic feet per second.

The concentration of alkalinity in the waters of Balliet Run is 11 milligrams per liter.

A facility known as the YRC Wilkes Barre Terminal has a permit to discharge sewage into Balliet Run.

Geography and geology

Balliet Run is a small stream and is said to resemble a mountain stream fed by springs. An article in Times Leader stated that "one gets the feeling that there is something special about the cool, clear water contained within its banks". The stream is on the northern side of Nescopeck Mountain.

Most of the upper reaches of Balliet Run are on a glacial or resedimented till known as Wisconsinan Till. However, fill is present in some small areas of the watershed, as is bedrock consisting of sandstone, conglomerate, and shale.

Watershed
The mouth of the stream is in the United States Geological Survey quadrangle of Sybertsville. However, the source is in the quadrangle of Freeland.

Balliet Run is on private land that is closed to access throughout its entire length. There is a patch of wetland at the stream's headwaters.

History
Balliet Run was entered into the Geographic Names Information System on August 2, 1979. Its identifier in the Geographic Names Information System is 1168669.

In the 1980s, a skeet shooting club known as Ashley Skeet Club from the borough of Ashley owned a tract of land on Blue Ridge Trail at Balliet Run.

Balliet Run was stocked with fish in 1957. However, it was designated as Class A Wild Trout Waters in 2007. In 2013, a 100-acre tract of land on the stream underwent conservation for the area's bat and trout populations.

In the court case Pennsy Supple, Inc. v. Zoning Hearing Board of Dorrance County, it was alleged that sediment from a nearby quarry was adversely affecting Balliet Run. However, Patrick Bartorillo, president of the Small Mountain Quarry stated that "There will be no impact on wetlands, no impact on Balliet Run and we would enclose all the crushing equipment."

Biology
Balliet Run is inhabited by brown trout. The biomass of that species of trout in the stream is 59.73 kilograms per hectare, considerably higher than the minimum of 30 kilograms per hectare that is required for a stream to be designated as Class A Wild Trout Waters. Native brook trout also inhabit the stream.

Balliet Run is considered by the Pennsylvania Fish and Boat Commission to be Class A Wild Trout waters for brown trout from its headwaters to its confluence with Big Wapwallopen Creek. Balliet Run's designated uses are Coldwater Fishery and Migratory Fishery. However, its existing uses are High-Quality Coldwater Fishery and Migratory Fishery.

See also
Watering Run, next tributary of Big Wapwallopen Creek going upstream
List of rivers of Pennsylvania

References

Rivers of Luzerne County, Pennsylvania
Tributaries of the Susquehanna River
Rivers of Pennsylvania